In chemistry, a Verkade base (or Verkade superbase) is a superbase with the formula P(MeNCH2CH2)3N.  A colorless oil, it is an aminophosphine although its inventor John Verkade called it proazaphosphatrane. The trimethyl derivative or 2,5,8,9-tetraza-1-phosphabicyclo[3.3.3]undecane is the simplest.  Diverse analogues of the Verkade base are known, e.g. with isopropyl groups in place of methyl.

Synthesis and reactions
The Verkade base is generated by the reaction of N,N,N-trimethyltren with tris(dimethylamino)phosphine:
P(NMe2)3  +  (MeNHCH2CH2)3N  →  P(MeNCH2CH2)3N  +  3 Me2NH

The principal reaction of the Verkade base is protonation.  The proton is attacked by the Verkade base at phosphorus, which induces the formation of a transannular P-N bond.  The product exemplifies the structure of an atrane.

The conjugate acid [HP(MeNCH2CH2)3N]+ has a pKa of 32.9 in acetonitrile.  For comparison, the conjugate acid of triethylamine has a pKa near 17 in acetonitrile. Owing to its ability to deprotonate weak carbon acids, the Verkade base catalyzes a variety of condensation reactions.

Related compounds
Phosphazenes are phosphorus(V) derivatives with the formula RN=P(NR2)3.

References

Amides
Organophosphanes
Quaternary ammonium compounds
Superbases
Atranes